The Moosup River Site (RI-1153) is an archaeological site in Coventry, Rhode Island.  The site is located on a bluff overlooking the Moosup River in western Coventry, not far from the Connecticut state line.  The site was identified and excavated in 1985, yielding a quartzite Neville point, and radiocarbon dates to 3050 BCE.

The site was added to the National Register of Historic Places in 1987.

See also
National Register of Historic Places listings in Kent County, Rhode Island

References

Coventry, Rhode Island
National Register of Historic Places in Kent County, Rhode Island
Archaeological sites on the National Register of Historic Places in Rhode Island